The Manawar Tawi river (also called Rajouri Tawi and Naushera Tawi) is a tributary of the Chenab River, which originates at the Ratan Pir ridge of the Pir Panjal Range and flows through the Rajouri and Jammu districts of Jammu and Kashmir, India and the Sialkot District of Pakistani Punjab, where it joins the Chenab at Marala Headworks. The towns along its course include Thana Mandi, Rajouri and Naushera. Towards the end of its course, it flows through the plains of the Jammu district west of Akhnur close to the Line of Control dividing the Pakistan-administered and Indian-administered Kashmir regions.

See also 
 Tawi River

References

External links 
 The course of Manawar Tawi river marked on OpenStreetMap:
 Source to Rajouri 1, 2, 3
 Rajouri to Naushera: 4, 5, 6, 7, 8, 9,
 Naushera to Chenab: 10, 11, 12, 13

Jammu Division
Jammu (city)
Rivers of Jammu and Kashmir
Indus basin
Rivers of India